SPR Chrobry Głogów is a men's handball club from Głogów, Poland, that plays in the Superliga.

Titles 

 Superliga:
  2nd: 2006

Team

Current squad
Squad for the 2022–23 season

Goalkeepers
1  Rafał Stachera
 16  Borys Klupś
 22  Anton Deryevyankin

Left wingers
3  Kacper Grabowski
 27  Wojciech Styrcz
Right wingers
4  Marcel Zdobylak
 13  Tomasz Kosznik
Line players
 17  Jakub Orpik
 31  Mateusz Wiatrzyk
 78  Bartosz Skiba

Left backs
5  Bartosz Warmijak
9  Tomasz Klinger
 15  Oleksandr Tilte
Centre backs
 20  Wojciech Dadej
 26  Anton Otrezov
 35  Paweł Paterek
Right backs
 18  Rafał Jamioł
 24  Wojciech Matuszak

Transfers
Transfers for the 2022–23 season

 Joining
  Wojciech Dadej (CB) (from  Grupa Azoty Unia Tarnów)
  Mateusz Wiatrzyk (P) (from  SMS Kielce)

 Leaving
  Dawid Krzywicki (LB) (to ?)
  Dawid Przysiek (CB) (to ?)
  Damian Krzysztofik (P) (to  Stal Mielec)

References

External links 
Official website 

Polish handball clubs
Sport in Lower Silesian Voivodeship
Handball clubs established in 1961
1961 establishments in Poland
Głogów County